Jasminum multiflorum, commonly known as star jasmine, is a species of jasmine in the family Oleaceae. 

In Indian mythology, Kund is known for its whiteness. So, instead of the common western phrase 'white as snow', what often appears in Hindu mythological stories is 'white as kunda'. Also, beautiful white teeth are often compared to Kunda buds. It is held to be especially sacred to Vishnu.
In Manipur, Kundo flowers are used in worship, and are an essential part of a marriage ceremony. The bride garlands the groom with two Kundo flower garlands. The groom then takes one of the two and garlands the bride.

Distribution 
Jasminum multiflorum is native to India, Nepal, Bhutan, Laos, Burma, Thailand, and Vietnam. It is widely cultivated in tropical and subtropical regions. While Jasmine flowers are known for its attractive and intensely fragrant flower, this species does not have any scent. The species is reportedly naturalised in Florida, Chiapas, Central America, Queensland, and much of the West Indies.

Etymology
'Jasminum' is a Latinized form of the Arabic word, 'yasemin' for sweetly scented plants.

References

External links

Floridata 602, star jasmine
Garden of Tomorrow, Jasminum multiflorum 
Flowers of India, kunda
Atlas of Florida Vascular Plants Jasminum multiflorum

multiflorum
Flora of the Indian subcontinent
Flora of Indo-China
Garden plants
Plants described in 1807
Taxa named by Nicolaas Laurens Burman
Lamiales of Asia